Catocala jansseni is a moth in the family Erebidae first described by A. E.  Prout in 1924. It is found in China.

References

External links
Original description: 

jansseni
Moths described in 1924
Moths of Asia